Per Johansson (born 10 November 1970) is a Swedish handball coach for Netherlands women’s national team.

He was head coach for the Sweden women's national team between 2009 and 2012. At the 2010 European Women's Handball Championship he led the Swedish team to the final match against Norway.

In March 2017 he became coach of CSM București until the end of the season.

At the end of November 2017 it was announced that Johansson will lead Montenegro in the 2017 IHF World Championship as coach of the women's National Team, replacing Dragan Adžić.

In 2020 he became coach of Rostov-Don, a contract which he ended in March 2022 because of the Russian invasion of Ukraine. Since 2022 he's the coach of Netherlands women’s national team.

Achievements  
European Championships
2010 – 2nd
EHF Champions League
2017 – 3rd

References

1970 births
Living people
Swedish handball coaches
Swedish expatriate sportspeople in Romania
Swedish expatriate sportspeople in Montenegro
Swedish expatriate sportspeople in Russia
Handball coaches of international teams
People from Uddevalla Municipality
Sportspeople from Västra Götaland County